Corrado D'Errico (1902–1941) was an Italian screenwriter and film director. D'Errico was one of a number of directors in the Fascist era to graduate from the Instituto Luce.

Selected filmography

Director
 Golden Arrow (1935)
 The Castiglioni Brothers (1937)
 All of Life in One Night (1938)
 Star of the Sea (1938)
 Diamonds (1939)
 Trial and Death of Socrates (1939)
 Captain Tempest (1942)
 The Lion of Damascus (1942)

Screenwriter
 Rails (1929)
 Aldebaran (1937)
 The Faceless Voice (1939)

References

Bibliography 
 Brunetta, Gian Piero. The History of Italian Cinema: A Guide to Italian Film from Its Origins to the Twenty-first Century. Princeton University Press, 2009.

External links 
 

1902 births
1941 deaths
20th-century Italian screenwriters
Italian film directors
Writers from Rome
Italian male screenwriters
20th-century Italian male writers